Roger Waters: Us + Them is a 2019 British concert film and live album by English musician Roger Waters, founding member of Pink Floyd. The film was directed by Waters and Sean Evans, and captures a truncated performance from Waters' tour of the same name. This is the second film where both Waters and Evans are involved, their first being Roger Waters: The Wall.

The film, recorded across the four shows from the Ziggo Dome in Amsterdam., features songs from Pink Floyd albums and Waters' last album, Is This the Life We Really Want?.

Release
The cinema release of the film was accompanied by a documentary titled A Fleeting Glimpse, capturing behind the scenes footage of the band rehearsing, performing sound-checks before shows and the aftermath of performances. Before its theatrical release, the film premiered on 7 September 2019 at Venice Film Festival. The film released in theaters across the world on 2 and 6 October in 2019.

In May 2020, it was announced that the film would be getting a digital release, starting with YouTube on 16 June, and followed by Blu-ray, DVD, 3-LP and 2-CD set on 2 October, including as an extra, the songs "Smell the Roses" & "Comfortably Numb" on the DVD and Blu-Ray.

Performers and personnel

 Rufat Aliyev as Refugee
 Farshid Azizi as Refugee
 Nikoo Bafti as Refugee
 Azzurra Caccetta as The Last Refugee
 Anais Dupay-Rahman as Her Child
 Salem Hanna as Refugee
 Hayley as Dancer in Money
 Glendon Jones as Prisoner
 Farzad Khaledi as Refugee
 Buket Komur as Palestinian Girl
 Lucas Kornacki as Drone Pilot
 Jad Marz as Refugee
 Pedram Mehdian as Refugee
 Nader Moradi as Refugee
 Feride Morcay as Refugee
 Liat Mordechai as Refugee
 Farahnaz Rahmani as Refugee
 Sylvana Savvas as Refugee
 Reza Zohreh Kermani as Refugee (as Reza Kermani)

Musicians 
 Roger Waters - vocals, guitars, bass
 Gus Seyffert - backing vocals, guitars, bass  
 Jonathan Wilson - guitars, vocals
 Dave Kilminster - guitars, talkbox, backing vocals
 Jon Carin - keyboards, piano, programming, synthesizers, lap steel guitar, guitars, backing vocals 
 Bo Koster - keyboards, hammond organ
 Holly Laessig - vocals
 Jess Wolfe - vocals
 Ian Ritchie - saxophone
 Joey Waronker - drums

Track listing

CD one:

 "Intro" 
 "Speak to Me" (Played on tape, with parts of the vocal track from "When We Were Young")
 "Breathe"
 "One of These Days"
 "Time / Breathe (Reprise)"
 "The Great Gig in the Sky"
 "Welcome to the Machine"
 "Déjà Vu"
 "The Last Refugee"
 "Picture That"
 "Wish You Were Here"
 "The Happiest Days of Our Lives"
 "Another Brick in the Wall (Part II)"
 "Another Brick in the Wall (Part III)"

CD two:
 
 "Dogs"
 "Pigs (Three Different Ones)"
 "Money"
 "Us and Them"
 "Brain Damage" (with vocal intro)
 "Eclipse"
 "The Last Refugee (Reprise)"
 "Deja Vu (Reprise)"

Extra tracks: (Only on the digital, DVD & Blu-Ray editions)

 Smell the Roses
 Comfortably Numb

Charts

Certifications

References

External links
 
 
 

2019 films
2019 documentary films
2020 live albums
Columbia Records live albums
British documentary films
Roger Waters
2010s English-language films
2010s British films